21st NSFC Awards
January 5, 1987

Best Film: 
 The Dead 
The 21st National Society of Film Critics Awards, given on 5 January 1987, honored the best filmmaking of 1986.

Winners

Best Picture 
1. Blue Velvet
2. Hannah and Her Sisters
3. Platoon

Best Director 
1. David Lynch – Blue Velvet
2. Andrei Tarkovsky – The Sacrifice (Offret)
3. Oliver Stone – Platoon and Salvador

Best Actor 
1. Bob Hoskins – Mona Lisa
2. Jeff Goldblum – The Fly
3. Paul Newman – The Color of Money

Best Actress 
1. Chloe Webb – Sid and Nancy
2. Sandrine Bonnaire – Vagabond (Sans toit ni loi)
2. Kathleen Turner – Peggy Sue Got Married

Best Supporting Actor 
1. Dennis Hopper – Blue Velvet
2. Daniel Day-Lewis – My Beautiful Laundrette and A Room with a View
3. Ray Liotta – Something Wild

Best Supporting Actress 
1. Dianne Wiest – Hannah and Her Sisters
2. Barbara Hershey – Hannah and Her Sisters

Best Screenplay 
1. Hanif Kureishi – My Beautiful Laundrette
2. Woody Allen – Hannah and Her Sisters

Best Cinematography 
1. Frederick Elmes – Blue Velvet
2. Robby Müller – Down by Law
3. Donald McAlpine – Down and Out in Beverly Hills

Best Documentary 
1. Marlene
2. Sherman's March
3. Partisans of Vilna

References

External links
Past Awards

1986
National Society of Film Critics Awards
National Society of Film Critics Awards
National Society of Film Critics Awards